Unus is a village and municipality in the Ordubad District of Nakhchivan, Azerbaijan. It is located 33 km in the north-west from the district center, on the slope of the Zangezur ridge. Its population is busy with gardening, farming and animal husbandry. There are secondary school, library, club and a medical center in the village. It has a population of 743.

Etymology
According to researchers, unus is a distorted form of the word of əniz//eniz (groove in the ground, arable land, arable, pasture, empty field) in the Turkic languages.

See also 
 St. Khach Monastery (Unus)

References

External links 

Populated places in Ordubad District